Spare the Rod is a 1961 British social drama directed by Leslie Norman and starring Max Bygraves, Geoffrey Keen, Donald Pleasence and Richard O'Sullivan. The film was based on the 1954 novel by Michael Croft and deals with an idealistic schoolteacher coming to a tough area of East London to teach in a secondary modern school at a time when such establishments were largely starved of attention and resources from education authorities and were widely regarded as dumping grounds with sub-par teaching standards, for the containment of non-academically inclined children until they reached the school-leaving age.

The film was likened on its release to a British Blackboard Jungle, and later as a precursor in theme to the better-known To Sir, with Love (1967). A contemporary reviewer described the film as "a courageous portrayal of the unhappier side of British education...an honest, honourable piece, which recognises that there are good teachers, discouraged teachers and some that are not fit for the job." It was Bygraves's last feature film before he decided to channel his career towards light entertainment rather than acting. O'Sullivan's role as a wayward but promising pupil is a counterpoint to his similar role two years earlier in the comedy Carry On Teacher.

Plot
John Saunders (Bygraves), a supply teacher with progressive anti-corporal punishment views, arrives to take up a post at Worrell Street School in a socially deprived area of East London. He is assigned a class of pupils in their last year before leaving school and finds himself in charge of a group of rebellious, badly-behaved teenagers from poor home backgrounds, with no interest in education, who register their defiance of authority by fighting, throwing classroom furniture around, whistling and laughing during bible readings and smoking in class. The school's headmaster Jenkins (Pleasence) is well-meaning but has long become despondent with the seemingly insurmountable challenges posed by his pupils and is resigned to merely serving out his time until retirement. His view that corporal punishment is the only way to maintain even some semblance of order in the classrooms ("You'll never be able to handle them unless you're as tough as they are") is anathema to Saunders, who states his intention to try all other methods of discipline rather than resort to physical violence.

Saunders's teaching colleagues are all resistant to any change in the school's punishment policy, with their attitudes informed either by disillusion and the fear of otherwise losing control of their pupils completely, or in the case of Arthur Gregory (Keen) by a seeming relish for corporal punishment which borders on the sadistic. All share the view that it is useless to try to provide a meaningful education to children whom they have already written off as leaving school only to drift into dead-end jobs, and that the best they can hope to do is to maintain some degree of order in the classroom. Saunders sticks to his principles and starts to make some little headway with his class, although they are baffled by his refusal to rise to provocation and disobedience. He spots particular promise in one of the main trouble-makers, Fred Harkness (O'Sullivan), and tries to encourage the boy to explore his potential. The first time Saunders caned any pupils involved Harkness, though it is revealed in a later scene that it was not Harkness's fault: in fact, he was trying to prevent several other pupils from rioting. When Saunders offers him a handshake and an apology at the end of the scene, Harkness refuses and marches out of the room, all trust between them broken.

Matters come to a head when as a prank the pupils lock Gregory in the school toilets overnight. The following morning Gregory seeks revenge on those he considers to be the ringleaders, singling Harkness out for punishment. His assault on the boy escalates beyond reasonable bounds, with him delivering roughly ten strokes of the cane to his left hand, which was twisted behind his back, and Saunders has to step in to restrain him. Taking advantage of the situation, the other pupils instigate a full-scale classroom riot. Saunders then finds himself being held responsible for undermining the school's strict discipline protocol. He is forced to decide whether he can, and should, continue to teach in such an environment, but has the consolation of finally connecting fully with Harkness and convincing him he is talented enough to aspire to something better on leaving school.

Cast

 Max Bygraves as John Saunders
 Geoffrey Keen as Arthur Gregory
 Donald Pleasence as Mr. Jenkins
 Richard O'Sullivan as Fred Harkness
 Betty McDowall as Ann Collins
 Peter Reynolds as Alec Murray
 Jean Anderson as Mrs. Pond

 Eleanor Summerfield as Mrs. Harkness
 Mary Merrall as Miss Fogg
 Aubrey Woods as Mr. Bickerstaffe
 Rory MacDermot as Mr. Richards
 Jeremy Bulloch as Angell
 Claire Marshall as Margaret
 Annette Robertson as Doris

Production
Michael Croft's novel of the same name was published in 1954, as an attack on corporal punishment and an explanation of the problems of teaching in secondary modern schools; it was not popular with the teaching profession. It was soon noticed by the film director Ronald Neame, who asked Croft to prepare a film script; however when he submitted the script to the Board of Film Censors he was told that such a film would be given an X certificate because "It would be highly improper for children who are going to school next day to sit and watch a film about masters who are frankly sadists". News of the Board's decision was made public by the education correspondent of the News Chronicle, prompting a debate on film censorship in general.

In 1959 Max Bygraves, who had grown up in similar circumstances in south London and was keen to play a dramatic part in a film of the book, met with Croft. Bygraves was unaware of the debate about the X certificate, but noted that Room at the Top had been a critical and commercial success despite receiving one; he was willing to put his own money into the project. Croft sold the film rights. Neame dropped out and Leslie Norman thought the original film script "too heavy"; the first rewrite gave Saunders a wife and a subplot about whether she could have children. This element was later dropped by adapter John Cresswell who stuck closely to the book, although he added two scenes not present in the book: an attempt by a girl pupil to seduce Saunders, and a riot by the pupils. The finished film was passed with an A certificate.

Reception
The film recorded a loss to Bryanston of £14,786.

References

External links 
 
 
 
 

1961 films
1961 drama films
1960s coming-of-age drama films
British coming-of-age drama films
British black-and-white films
Films based on British novels
Films scored by Laurie Johnson
Films set in schools
Films set in London
Films directed by Leslie Norman
1960s English-language films
1960s British films